Kleine Vils (in its upper course: Krumbächlein) is a river of Bavaria, Germany. At its confluence with the Große Vils near Gerzen, the Vils is formed.

See also
List of rivers of Bavaria

References

Rivers of Bavaria
Landshut (district)
Rivers of Germany